The 1904 Open Championship was the 44th Open Championship, held 8–10 June at Royal St George's Golf Club in Sandwich, England. Jack White won his only major title, one stroke ahead of runners-up James Braid and J.H. Taylor, both former champions.

For the first time, the Open was scheduled for three days; the final day remained at 36 holes, but the first two rounds were now over two days. Those within nineteen strokes of the leader made the 36-hole cut, with the additional provision that the final day's field had to contain at least 32 professionals.

The opening round on Wednesday was cold and windy, which led to some high scoring. Robert Thomson led with 75 after reaching the turn in 34. He was a shot ahead of amateur John Graham Jr. and Harry Vardon. It was less windy on Thursday for the second round, and Vardon led on 149, followed by Thomson on 151 and Graham on 152. James Sherlock set a new record for the Open with 71, while Willie Park Jr. scored 72; 52 players were within nineteen strokes of Vardon and made the cut at 168 or better.

Overnight rain and light winds made for some low scoring on Friday. Braid set a new Championship record with a 69 in the third round, reaching the turn in 31. White has the second best score with a 72. After the morning round, Braid led on 226 with White on 227; Vardon was at 228 after a disappointing 79.

White, one of the early starters in the afternoon, scored 69 for 296. Braid also played well but his 71 left him a shot behind. He holed a long putt at the 15th but a four at the short 16th left him too much to do. Taylor was the last player with a chance to catch White but needed a 67 to do so. Starting 3-3-2, he reached the turn in 32. However, like Braid, he took four at the 16th and also ended up a shot behind. His 68 was another new Open record. White's total of 296 was yet another, the first total under 300.

Past champions in the field 

Source:

Did not enter: William Auchterlonie (1893), Jack Burns (1888).

Round summaries

First round
Wednesday, 8 June 1904

Source:

Second round
Thursday, 9 June 1904

Source:

Third round
Friday, 10 June 1904 (morning)

Source:

Final round
Friday, 10 June 1904 (afternoon)

Source:

References

External links
Royal St George's 1904 (Official site)

The Open Championship
Golf tournaments in England
Open Championship
Open Championship
Open Championship